The women's trios competition at the 2006 Asian Games in Doha was held on 5 and 6 December 2006 at Qatar Bowling Centre.

Schedule
All times are Arabia Standard Time (UTC+03:00)

Results

References 

Results at ABF Website
Results

External links
Official Website

Women's trios